Adavadi is a 2007 Tamil language psychological thriller film directed by V. S. Bharath Hanna. The film stars Sathyaraj and Radha alongside an ensemble cast including Y. Gee. Mahendra, Sathyapriya, K. R. Vatsala, Vaiyapuri, Suja Varunee, Ganja Karuppu, and Malaysia Vasudevan. It was released on 30 March 2007. The film is a remake of the 1998 Kannada film A.

Plot
Bharath (Sathyaraj) is a perfectionist film director. Being a short-tempered person, he deals with people with arrogance and disrespectfulness. Chandini (Radha), a debut-making actress, falls in love with Bharath. When Chandini openly declares her love for Bharath in front of everyone, he gets angry and slaps her. Since that, Chandini gets away from him and latches on to a financier. Bharath cannot forget her and takes to drinking. What transpires later forms the crux of the story.

Cast

Sathyaraj as Bharath
Radha as Chandini
Y. Gee. Mahendra as Bharath's father
Sathyapriya as Bharath's mother
K. R. Vatsala as Chandini's mother
Vaiyapuri as Michael
Suja Varunee
Ganja Karuppu
Malaysia Vasudevan
Fathima Babu
T. P. Gajendran
Alex
Parvesh
Afzal
Muthukaalai
Telephone Subramanian
Sharmili
Kovai Senthil

Production

After the commercially successful film Adi Thadi (2004), director Shivaraj (who has changed his name to Bharath Hanna) and Sathyaraj team up for the second time. Radha of Sundhara Travels fame was selected to play lead actress, while Deva was signed on as music composer.

Soundtrack

The film score and the soundtrack were composed by Deva. The soundtrack, released on 12 January 2007, features 4 tracks with lyrics written by Snehan, Piraisoodan and Senthilkumar.

Deva retained two songs from original version which are composed by Gurukiran. "Idhu One Day" retained as "Idhu One Day" and "Sum Sumne" retained as "En Anbea".

Reception

The film received mostly negative reviews. Settu Shankar of OneIndia described the film as a needless confusion. While KLT of hindu.com criticized the outmoded plot and treatment.

References

2007 films
Films scored by Deva (composer)
2000s Tamil-language films
Tamil remakes of Kannada films
Films about filmmaking
2007 psychological thriller films